Gérard Biard (born 4 August 1959) is a French journalist. He is the editor‑in‑chief of the satirical French news magazine, Charlie Hebdo.<ref name="Dean2015">{{cite web |url=https://www.theguardian.com/media/2015/may/05/charlie-hebdo-editors-we-are-not-naive |title=Charlie Hebdo editors: 'We are not naive' |work=The Guardian |date=5 May 2015 |archive-url=https://web.archive.org/web/20151112172300/http://www.theguardian.com/media/2015/may/05/charlie-hebdo-editors-we-are-not-naive |archive-date=2015-11-12 |url-status=live |last=Dean |first=Michelle |location=London |issn=0261-3077 |quote='The thing that surprised me the most', Charlie Hebdos editor‑in‑chief Gérard Biard told an audience on Tuesday morning, 'was the bells of Notre‑Dame that rang for us'. }}</ref>

He has been associated with Charlie Hebdo since 1992, when it was relaunched after a 10-year hiatus. He was in London for a conference when Charlie Hebdo'''s Paris office was targeted in a January 2015 terrorist attack.<ref name="BBC2015">{{cite web |url=https://www.bbc.com/news/in-pictures-30712925 |title=Charlie Hebdo attack: the response in pictures |publisher=BBC News |date=7 January 2015 |archive-url=https://web.archive.org/web/20151014154239/http://www.bbc.com/news/in-pictures-30712925 |archive-date=2015-10-14 |url-status=live |location=London |quote=Charlie Hebdos editor‑in‑chief  Biard, who was in London during the attack, said: 'I don't understand how people can attack a newspaper with heavy weapons. A newspaper is not a weapon of war.'}}</ref>

In May 2015, Biard and film critic Jean-Baptiste Thoret accepted the PEN/Toni and James C. Goodale Freedom of Expression Courage Award on behalf of Charlie Hebdo.

Biard is strongly in favour of secularity. In October 2014 he participated in a conference of the French feminist organization Regards de femmes on the topic. He is a founder and spokesperson for Zéromacho'', an organization of men "against prostitution and for equality".

References

Living people
French secularists
French journalists
Year of birth uncertain
1959 births